The Beaumont Millionaires was the predominant name of a minor league baseball team located in Beaumont, Texas that existed between 1903 and 1906. The club was first formed on 1903 as the Beaumont Oil Gushers, before being renamed the Millionaires in 1904 and 1905. The Beaumont team played its entire history in the South Texas League. In 1906, the team became the first incarnation of the Beaumont Oilers before folding.

References

Defunct minor league baseball teams
Defunct baseball teams in Texas
Sports in Beaumont, Texas
Baseball teams in Beaumont, Texas
Baseball teams established in 1903
Sports clubs disestablished in 1906
1903 establishments in Texas
1906 disestablishments in Texas